Pitcairn Islanders, also referred to as Pitkerners and Pitcairnese, are the inhabitants of the Pitcairn Islands, a British Overseas Territory including people whose families were previously inhabitants and maintaining cultural connections. Most Pitcairn Islanders are Descendants of the Bounty mutineers. 

The mainstream Pitcairn culture is a mixture of British (specifically English, Cornish, Manx and Scottish) and Polynesian (specifically Tahitian) cultures derived from the traditions of the settlers that landed in 1790, plus a few that settled afterwards. As of 2021, there are a total of 47 people inhabiting the island.

There is also a Pitcairnese diaspora, particularly in Norfolk Island, New Zealand and mainland Australia. Fearing overcrowding, in 1856 all 194 Pitkerners immigrated to Norfolk Island aboard the Morayshire (including a baby born en route) but 16 of them returned to Pitcairn on the Mary Ann in 1858, followed by a further four families in 1864.

History

Discovery
Pitcairn Island was sighted on 3 July 1767 by the crew of the British sloop , commanded by Captain Philip Carteret. The island was named after Scottish Midshipman Robert Pitcairn, a fifteen-year-old crew member who was the first to sight the island. 

These words, recorded in Carteret's log, describe the first sighting. Robert Pitcairn was a son of British Marine Major John Pitcairn, who later was killed at the Battle of Bunker Hill in the American Revolution.

Settlement of Pitcairn
In 1790, nine of the mutineers from the Bounty, along with the native Tahitian men and women who were with them (six men, eleven women and a baby girl), settled on Pitcairn Islands and set fire to the Bounty. The wreck is still visible underwater in Bounty Bay, discovered in 1957 by National Geographic explorer Luis Marden. Although the settlers survived by farming and fishing, the initial period of settlement was marked by serious tensions among them. Alcoholism, murder, disease and other ills took the lives of most mutineers and Tahitian men. John Adams and Ned Young turned to the scriptures, using the ship's Bible as their guide for a new and peaceful society. Young eventually died of an asthmatic infection. The Polynesians also converted to Christianity (Church of England).  After the rediscovery of Pitcairn, John Adams was granted amnesty for his part in the mutiny.

Population history

*   1856 Emigration to Norfolk Island left Pitcairn uninhabited.
**  1859 First group returns from Norfolk Island.
As of 2018.

Surnames
As a result of the families who returned to the island starting in 1859 after settling Norfolk Island, most names therefore are descended from those six families. Occasionally a new person would arrive on the island bringing with them a new surname such as the American Samuel Russell Warren born 1830 in Rhode Island, U.S., fathered children with Agnes Christian (daughter of Thursday October Christian II), whose descendants still live on the island today. The McCoy surname (from the mutineer William McCoy) died out in 1973 with the death of Violet McCoy, who had married Floyd Hastings McCoy, a great-great grandson of William.

Characteristics
In the early 20th century a study was taken by American author Harry L. Shapiro on the characteristics of the islanders, based on the analysis and observations, for example - Pitcairners were taller than their parents and had produced a healthy number of children. There were more blue-eyed and light haired people in the mixed-race descendants than in a typical Tahitian population but more with very dark hair than people of ethnic English origin. A similar study was also taken on the Pitcairn diaspora in Norfolk Island.

Culture

The once-strict moral codes, which prohibited dancing, public displays of affection, smoking, and consumption of alcohol, have been relaxed in recent years. Islanders and visitors no longer require a six-month licence to purchase, import, and consume alcohol. There is now one licensed café and bar on the island, and the Government Store sells alcohol and cigarettes.

Fishing and swimming are two popular recreational activities. A birthday celebration or the arrival of a ship or yacht will involve the entire Pitcairn community in a public dinner in the Square, Adamstown. Tables are covered in a variety of foods, including fish, meat, chicken, philhi, baked rice, boiled plun (banana), breadfruit, vegetable dishes, an assortment of pies, bread, breadsticks, an array of desserts, pineapple and watermelon.

Public work ensures the ongoing maintenance of the island's numerous roads and paths. The island has a labour force of over 35 men and women (as of 2011).

Language

The majority of the resident Pitcairn Islanders are the descendants of the Bounty mutineers and Tahitians (or other Polynesians). Pitkern is a creole language derived from 18th-century English, with elements of the Tahitian language. It is spoken as a first language by the population and is taught alongside standard English at the island's only school. It is closely related to the creole language Norfuk, spoken on Norfolk Island, because Norfolk was repopulated in the mid-19th century by Pitcairners.

Religion

The entire population is Seventh-day Adventist. A successful Seventh-day Adventist mission in the 1890s was important in shaping Pitcairn society. In recent years, the church has declined, with only about eight islanders worshipping regularly, but most of them still attend church on special occasions. The Sabbath is observed as a day of rest and as a mark of respect for observant Adventists.

The church was built in 1954 and is run by the Church board and resident pastor, who usually serves a two-year term. The Sabbath School meets at 10 am on Saturday mornings, and is followed by Divine Service an hour later. On Tuesday evenings there is another service in the form of a prayer meeting.

Diaspora

Australia
The 2016 census showed that there were a total of 746 people with Pitcairn ancestry. However, this includes the population claiming Pitcairn descent in Norfolk Island.
There were 262 people of Pitcairn ancestry for the usually resident population in other states and territories of Australia (notably Queensland and New South Wales).

In the 2011 Australian census, there were 75 people speaking the Pitkern language (also called Pitcairnese) at home, an increase of 21% from the 2006 census which had 62 people speaking the language.

Norfolk Island

The 2016 Australian census included Norfolk Island for the first time. It showed that 20.0% or 484 people claimed Pitcairn ancestry. As in previous censuses, the 2011 Census asked a question relating to Pitcairn descent. Though for the first time, the 2011 Norfolk Island Census focuses on the Pitcairn descent of the "ordinarily resident population" rather than the "permanent population" of previous Censuses. 45.0 percent of the permanent population are of Pitcairn descent and 38.4 percent of the ordinarily resident population were of Pitcairn descent. Thus for every two persons of Pitcairn descent, there are three persons of non-Pitcairn descent in the ordinarily resident population on Norfolk Island.
Norfolk's Pitcairn descendants are already at least 7th or 8th generation, and those in younger age groups are probably 9th generation and the affinity with their heritage is naturally waning.

New Zealand
In the most recent 2018 census, 48 of the ‘usual residents population’ were born in Pitcairn island. In 2013 the Pitcairn Islander ethnic group comprised 177 people. 80.7 percent were born in New Zealand with 36 born overseas - 91.7% on Pitcairn Island. Between 2006 and 2013, the population decreased by 13.4 percent. This compares with an increase of 15.5 percent between 2001 and 2006.
 96.6 percent lived in the North Island and 1.7 percent lived in the South Island.
 The most common region this group lived in was Wellington Region (59.3 percent).
 The median age (half are younger and half are older than this age) was 37.2 years.
 81.9 percent were born in New Zealand and 19.4 percent were born overseas.
Ethnic identity:
 27.1 percent said Pitcairn Islander was their only ethnicity.
 35.6 percent said they belonged to two ethnic groups and 37.3 percent said they belonged to three or more ethnic groups.

Notable Pitcairn Islanders

Diaspora

See also

 :nl:Lijst van Tahitiaanse partners van de opvarenden van de HMAV Bounty
 Bibliography of Pitcairn Islands
 Europeans in Oceania
 Island Council (Pitcairn)
 Law enforcement in the Pitcairn Islands
 Norfolk Islanders
 Outline of the Pitcairn Islands

References

Pitcairn Islands people
Mutiny on the Bounty
Indigenous peoples of Polynesia
Ethnic groups in Oceania
European diaspora in Oceania